The Burning Wild Man, known in Japanese as  is a manga created by Tadashi Satō. It ran in Weekly Shōnen Jump from 1987 to 1991 with 19 volumes. It was later adapted into an anime series by Studio Pierrot. The 24 episode series aired on Nippon Television from March 1988 to September 1988.

 became lost in the mountains as a small child. A foster father raised Kenichi; when Kenichi was 15 the foster father told Kenichi about his background and the teenager returned to the civilized world at age 15.

Characters

Kokuhō Family
 
  . The main character and a practitioner of Cha Genmai Style Karate.

 
 Kenichi's little sister who often acts as his straight man.

 
 a.k.a. . The head of the Kokuhō family and a potted plant artisan.

 
 Kenichi's little brother.

 
 The young girl who lived as Kenichi's sister in the mountains.

 
 The old man who found and raised Kenichi and taught him karate.

 
 Kenichi's wolf companion from the mountains. He becomes the Kokuhō family pet. His face looks more like a cat face.

Classmates
 
 A school delinquent and third generation yakuza of the Hidou Boryokudan Group. He is always depicted with his mouth open in an evil smile. He likes Yukie.

 
 Yukie's best friend.

 
 A half-Japanese and half-Filipino boy who is highly influenced by American culture and is always wearing flashy outfits.

 

 

 
A pompous student who presents himself as chivalrous and tries to impress girls. 
 
An American transfer student who is very fascinated by Japanese culture.

Teachers

Animals
 
 a.k.a. .

Others
Narrator

Video game
Im 1989, Toho released an action video game adaptation of the anime for the Famicom, developed by Advance Communication Company. The game starred Kenichi as the main character, while featuring Hidou, Rocky, and Shiranui as playable characters in some levels. The goal of the game is to rescue Yukie from a dragon simply named Dra Gon.

The game was re-branded with a circus theme and released in North America under the name Circus Caper, also published by Toho. The RPG element with the final boss was removed, the stages and bosses are in different order, and many graphical and musical changes were made to better resemble a circus theme.

References

External links
 The Burning Wild Man
 Moero! Oni-san Studio Pierrot 
 

1987 manga
1988 anime television series debuts
1989 anime OVAs
Comedy anime and manga
Nippon TV original programming
Pierrot (company)
Shōnen manga
Shueisha franchises
Shueisha manga